The following are the records of Canada in Olympic weightlifting. Records are maintained in each weight class for the snatch lift, clean and jerk lift, and the total for both lifts by the Canadian Weightlifting Federation (CWFHC).

Current records
Key to tables:

Men

Women

Historical records

Men (1998–2018)

Women (1998–2018)

Notes

References
General
Canadian records 31 January 2023 updated
Specific

External links
CWFHC official website
CWFHC records page

records
Canada
Olympic weightlifting
weightlifting